Delta-11-Tetrahydrocannabinol (Delta-11-THC, Δ11-THC, Δ9(11)-THC, exo-Tetrahydrocannabinol) is a synthetic isomer of tetrahydrocannabinol, developed in the 1970s. It can be synthesised from Δ8-THC by several different routes, though only the (6aR, 10aR) enantiomer is known. It has recently in 2023 been discovered to possess approximately three times the potency of Delta-9 THC.

See also 
 11-Hydroxy-Delta-8-THC
 Delta-3-Tetrahydrocannabinol
 Delta-4-Tetrahydrocannabinol
 Delta-7-Tetrahydrocannabinol
 Delta-10-Tetrahydrocannabinol
 Hexahydrocannabinol
 L-759,656

References 

Benzochromenes
Cannabinoids